David Ledy (born September 22, 1987 in Altkirch) is a retired French footballer.

Club career 
Ledy began his career by FC Mulhouse and joined 2006 to RC Strasbourg, played here his first game on 7 November 2008 against FC Tours.

Coaching career
After retiring in the summer 2020, Ledy started coaching youth teams, among others at FC Istres and Olympique Rovenain.

References

External links

1987 births
Living people
French footballers
Ligue 2 players
FC Mulhouse players
RC Strasbourg Alsace players
FC Martigues players
FC Istres players
Association football forwards